Race Course Cemetery is a cemetery in Freetown, Sierra Leone. It is the burial place of William John Campbell a mayor Freetown, and the rest of the prominent Campbell family. Edward Wilmot Blyden is also buried at the cemetery.

References

Cemeteries in Sierra Leone
Buildings and structures in Freetown